Barber & Kluttz, spelled often as Barber & Klutz, was an architectural firm of Knoxville, Tennessee that produced pattern books used across the United States.  It was a partnership of George Franklin Barber (1854 – 1915) of Tennessee and Thomas A. Kluttz of Georgia.

A number of works using its designs are listed on the U.S. National Register of Historic Places.

Works include:
George Ferris Mansion, 607 W. Maple St., Rawlins, Wyoming (Barber & Kluttz), NRHP-listed
James L. Fleming House, 302 S. Greene St., Greenville, North Carolina (Barber & Kluttz), NRHP-listed
Orth C. Galloway House, 504 Park St., Clarendon, Arkansas (Barber & Kluttz), NRHP-listed
Dred and Ellen Yelverton House, 1979 NC 222 E., Fremont, North Carolina (Barber & Kluttz), NRHP-listed
Annamede, RD 1, Box 126, US 19, Walkersville, West Virginia (Barber & Kluttz), NRHP-listed
Robert L. Covington House, 240 S. Extension St., Hazlehurst, Mississippi (Barber & Kluttz), NRHP-listed
Fairchild House, 302 S. Main St., Monticello, Kentucky (Barber & Kluttz), NRHP-listed
First National Bank of Greenville, Main and S. Poplar Sts., Greenville, Mississippi (Barber & Kluttz), NRHP-listed
Lonnie A. Pope House, Jackson St. and Central of Georgia RR tracks, Douglas, Georgia (Barber & Kluttz), NRHP-listed
Dr. R.P. Anderson House (1903), 665 N. Main St., in North Main Street Historic District of Mocksville, North Carolina (Barber & Kluttz), NRHP-listed

See also
List of George Franklin Barber works, which includes some of these and other Barber works not involving partnership with Kluttz, without distinction

References

Architecture firms based in Tennessee